Ernst Anselm Joachim Honigmann, FBA (29 November 1927 – 18 July 2011) was a German-born British scholar of English Literature, Shakespeare scholar, and Fellow of the British Academy.

Early life 
Born in Breslau, Germany (now Wrocław, Poland), Ernst Honigmann arrived in England in 1935, age 7, as a refugee from Nazi Germany, together with his father, the zoologist Dr Hans D. S. Honigmann (Director of Breslau Zoo), mother, Ursula, and brothers, Friederich and Paul.

Education and career 
Honigmann attended Hillhead High School (Glasgow). He took his first degree in English Literature at the University of Glasgow 1944-48. He gained his BLitt working on a study of the chronology of Shakespeare's plays, under the supervision of J. C. Maxwell, at Merton College, Oxford 1948-50.

Honigmann was one of the three founder Fellows of the Shakespeare Institute (University of Birmingham) in Stratford-upon-Avon, where he worked from 1951 to 1954. He gained his Doctor of Letters after returning to the University of Glasgow from 1954 to 1967, where he was lecturer in English alongside Peter Alexander, his former teacher. In 1968 Honigmann became reader and two years later Joseph Cowen Professor of English Literature at Newcastle University (also holding the position of leader of the English Department for 20 years), until his retirement from active University life in 1989, whereupon he was appointed emeritus professor. Honigmann was also elected to the Fellowship of the British Academy in 1989.

Honigmann authored and edited many books and papers, annotated editions of texts, and was a General Editor of the Revels Plays & Revels Plays Companion Library from 1976 to 2000. His classic texts remain relevant, and have been reprinted many times.

Honigmann continued to write after his retirement with his last paper being published posthumously. In retirement he worked both independently and on several collaborations in Shakespeare studies, created a new edition of Othello for the Arden Shakespeare, wrote a personal memoir Togetherness: Episodes from the Life of a Refugee, and created poetry and short stories (the latter mainly for the amusement of his grandchildren).

Major publications

Books 
 The Stability of Shakespeare's Text (Edward Arnold, 1965)
 Shakespearian Tragedy and the Mixed Response Inaugural lecture (University of Newcastle, 1971)
 Shakespeare: Seven Tragedies - The Dramatist's Manipulation of Response (Macmillan, 1976; Palgrave 2002)
 Shakespeare's Mingled Yarn and 'Measure for Measure' (OUP, 1981)
 Shakespeare's Impact on his Contemporaries (Macmillan, 1982)
 Shakespeare: The Lost Years (Manchester University Press, 1985)
 Shakespeare and his Contemporaries: Essays in comparison (Ed.) (Revels Plays Companion Library, 1986)
 John Weever: a biography of a literary associate of Shakespeare and Jonson, together with a photographic facsimile of Weever's 'Epigrammes'  (Manchester University Press, 1987)
 Myriad-minded Shakespeare: Essays chiefly on the Tragedies and Problem Comedies (Macmillan, 1989)
 Playhouse Wills, 1558-1642 with Susan Brock (Revels Plays Companion Library, 1993)
 British Academy Shakespeare Lectures, 1980-89 (Ed.) (British Academy, OUP, 1993)
 The Texts of Othello and Shakespearian Revision (Routledge, 1996)

Editions 
 King John (Arden Shakespeare, 1954)
  Milton's Sonnets (Macmillan, 1966)
 King Richard the Third (New Penguin Shakespeare, 1968)
 Twelfth Night, or What You Will (The Macmillan Shakespeare, 1971)
 Paradise Lost, Book X with C. A. Patrides (The Macmillan Milton, 1972)
 Othello (Arden Shakespeare, 1997, 3rd edn 2001)

Other publications 
 Togetherness: episodes from the life of a refugee by E. A. J. Honigmann
 Catholic Shakespeare? A response to Hildegard Hammerschmidt-Hummel by E. A. J. Honigmann
 Contributions by E. A. J. Honigmann to The New York Review of Books

References

External links 
 Obituary in The Telegraph
 Newcastle University Newslink article
 Review of E. A. J. Honigmann, 'Shakespeare: seven tragedies revisited: the dramatist's manipulation of response'  by Gabriel Egan

Shakespearean scholars
Fellows of the British Academy
Alumni of Merton College, Oxford
Alumni of the University of Glasgow
Academics of Newcastle University
Jewish emigrants from Nazi Germany to the United Kingdom
1927 births
2011 deaths
People from the Province of Lower Silesia
People educated at Hillhead High School